The Final Last of the Ultimate End (최후의 마지막 결말의 끝 Choihu ŭi majimak kyŏrmal ŭi ggŭt) is a collection of short stories by Kwak Jaesik, first published in 2015 by Opus Press.

It contains the following short stories:

"I Meet Her"
"Mind Reading (short story)"
"The Superpower"
"The Final Last of the Ultimate End (short story)"
"32 Years of Robot Rebel"
"Do Not Open It"
"Do Not Stop Reading This or It Blows"
"From Dusk of Sunday Till Dawn of Monday"

Most of the stories are categorized into science fiction, but there are exceptions, such as "Do Not Open It". "Do Not Open It" and "Do Not Stop Reading This or It Blows" have metafiction elements.

"Do Not Stop Reading This or It Blows" is an extended version of his story published in the October 2011 issue of Esquire Korean edition.

Critical response 
Seonghun Kim, Editor for Cine 21, praised its uniqueness and entertainment value as "charming stories beginning from extra ordinary things but always going with realistic background". 
Hankook Ilbo also described The Final Last of the Ultimate End as "stories that give catharsis of breaking away from everyday routine". 
On the other hand, Hyojeong Yoon of Inter Park criticized it, writing "they are funny but too obsessive about humor and joke".

I Meet Her
In "I Meet Her" (original Korean title: "그녀를 만나다"), a man recently recovered from a terminal disease, now waiting for his girlfriend, recounts his experiences in hospital and in recovery institute.

Plot summary
A man who had a terminal disease decided to get a whole body transplant surgery, removing his brain from his original body and transplanting it to a new brainless body, which was cloned from his cell. He gets the surgery and it seems to be successful.

He is moved to a recovery institute, adapting himself to his new body. He suffers for mild amnesia and partial motor disturbance, but he works hard to get better, waiting for the day to meet his girlfriend for the first time after the surgery.

When he finally meets his girlfriend, he feels happy, knowing all his feeling and memories about her are right and the interaction with her is natural enough. But his girlfriend looks sad.

It turns out that the surgery was splitting his brain into 2 pieces and transplanting them into 2 different bodies, to achieve the safer result from the redundancy. Hence now there are 2 independent separate people formed from one original person. All the activities in the recovery institute were parts of a test to decide whom to be a person to inherit the original identity. Even the meeting with the girlfriend was also a part of the test.

The protagonist turns out to be a loser in every aspects of the brain activity and continuity, except the only one part, that is the memory and the interactivity with spouse. Therefore, the other person gets the original identity and the protagonist gets a brand new identity as a newly born person.

A few months later, he becomes a surfer, that he has always dreamed to be since long before the surgery. He feels quite stable in his new life. But after coincidentally encountering the other person and his girlfriend, he realizes that he still loves her.

Critical response
In an article published in Science Times, Jangwon Go praised it, mentioning "being close to essence of science fiction, and raising an interesting question about nature of human existence". But he also criticized its "too explicit speech at the end of the story".

Mind Reading
In "Mind Reading" (original Korean title: "독심술"), a man and a woman, who are working for a metal coloring company, try to win a deal with a smart phone maker, guessing the designer's thought.

Plot summary
A man and a woman, who are employees of a metal coloring company, teamed up to win a deal with a smart phone maker. This smart phone maker wanted to buy colored metal cases for their newly developed phone from one of the metal coloring companies. The different metal coloring companies in competition wished the color order from the designer of the phone maker being one that are familiar with them, for example, one preferred RGB color model and another preferred CMYK color model. However the designer of the phone maker announced, "the color of the phone should be like a color of clean water from a deep mountain". The description of the color was so vague that all the metal coloring companies could not easily make their sample.

One German company sent their employees to a deep mountain and tried to find the actual color of the water, and one US company performed big data analysis to get the statistically most representative color meant by the expression, "clean water from deep mountain". One Japanese company sent spies to know information about the personal preference of the designer.
But the winner turned out to be the team of the man and the woman, who ran a small brain washing program that continuously gave a large number of images of clean water with their own color to the designer in various exposure route, such as TV commercials, signs, and illustrations of the books, all manipulated by them to be with clean water colored by their color.

The Final Last of the Ultimate End
In "The Final Last of the Ultimate End" (original Korean title: "최후의 마지막 결말의 끝"), a man, who faces the ultimate fate of the universe, is trying to find what he can do.

Plot summary
A man who is a pilot of an experimental project, accelerating a spaceship to the speed of light, reaches extremely far future, due to accidental time dilation. He realizes that the time he is arrived at is the heat death of the universe, which means that he cannot see any person, any living creature, any planet, any star, any reactive atom, nor any active thing what so ever.

Suffering from extreme loneliness and boredom, he tries to discover one meaningful thing, thinking of his own study of time travel, hoping to get back to his old life or solipsism of being god-like-status, since he is the most magnificent being in the universe and the total representation of the universe for the moment. But he soon finds out those thoughts are only megalomaniac fantasy, and not real possibility of solution for his current status, but just being mad.

After a while, he begins to do things that he wanted to do for a long time. He produces his own version of Waiting for Godot by himself and for himself, and he thinks one he has truly loved over and over again. At the end of the story, he asks to the reader, "what will be the end of this story?". The options he suggests are suicide and mental breakdown. However the true end of the story is hearing transmission from his loved one, who has followed him with the same kind of spaceship only to meet him.

Critical response
Seonghun Kim, Editor for Cine 21, praised its sense of realism and easiness as "recalling me The Martian (Weir novel)".

32 Years of Robot Rebel
In "32 Years of Robot Rebel" (original Korean title: "로봇 반란 32년"),  a man who discovers a mysterious network packet tries to find out its meaning in a futuristic society where robots are in charge of all the infant care.

Plot summary
A man lives in a society where robots are in charge of all the infant care. It originally began with an automatic cradle which was made by a washing machine manufacturer who developed motor system controlled by an artificial intelligence, resembling human hands. Then it has been developed as fully automated newborn baby/infant care robot, through several technological innovations. This results new social issues, such as upper class who prefers human nannies to robot system, generation gap caused by educational differences from version updates of software used in robot nannies, robot memory backup facility called "cemetery" used by people who do not want to just throw away their robot nannies after being grown-ups etc.

One day, this man, working in a communication company, discovers a mysterious network packet, but fails to understand its meaning. 32 years later, after his retirement, he tries to study the mystery packet once again. The packet, finally, turns out to be an educational program sent to the robot nannies, making the children's personalities to a certain preference, eventually voting for a person who becomes a president of the nation. This president, who has been actually a cyborg controlled by an artificial intelligence, invites the man and asks not to disclose all this story, since everything in this society is beneficial to the people as it is, and they like his regime so much that elect him again as the first emperor.

Critical response
Dcdc, a writer, praised it as "recommendable with regard to AlphaGo".

References

2015 short story collections
Science fiction short story collections
Korean short story collections
2010s science fiction works